Verdugo Wash is a  tributary of the Los Angeles River, in the Glendale area of Los Angeles County, California.

The stream begins just south of Interstate 210 in the Crescenta Valley. It flows southeast along the eastern edge of the Verdugo Mountains, then south through a pass between those mountains and the San Rafael Hills, and finally west to ultimately join the Los Angeles River just northeast of Griffith Park. Its entire path is located within the city of Glendale. With the exception of the free-flowing stream inside the Verdugo Wash Debris Basin Dam, Verdugo Wash is entirely encased in a concrete flood control channel.

Crossings
From mouth to source (year built in parentheses):

 Railroad: Union Pacific Coast Line
 San Fernando Road (1939)
 Concord Street (1940)
 North Kenilworth Avenue (1936)
 North Pacific Avenue (1981)
 North Central Avenue (1981)
 Hilton Los Angeles North/Glendale
 North Brand Boulevard (1986)
 Road to Nestle Building
 North Louise Street (1990)
 North Jackson Street (1969)
 Geneva Street (1938)
 East Glenoaks Boulevard (1938)
 East Mountain Street (1936)
 Canada Boulevard (1933)
 Verdugo Woodlands Elementary School [Pedestrian Bridge]
 Wabasso Way (1938)
 Opechee Way (1940)
 Glorietta Avenue (1941)
 Glorietta Park [Pedestrian Bridge]
 Canada Boulevard (1933)
 Oakmont Country Club [6 Pedestrian Bridges]
 Verdugo Wash Debris Basin Dam
 Oakmont View Drive (1979)
 Shirlyjean Street (1953)
 Whiting Woods Road (1967)
 New York Avenue/Kadletz Road (1967)
 Crescenta Valley Park [Pedestrian Bridge]
 Boston Avenue (1957)

References

External links

 Los Angeles County Department of Public Works Drainage Area Map

Rivers of Los Angeles County, California
Tributaries of the Los Angeles River
Washes of California
Crescenta Valley
San Rafael Hills
Verdugo Mountains
Glendale, California
Rivers of Southern California